Cameron White (born 30 April 1977, in Melbourne, Australia) is a professional squash player from Australia.

In 2004, White won the men's doubles title at the World Doubles Squash Championships, partnering Byron Davis.

External links  
 Profile at psa-squash.com 
 

Australian male squash players
Living people
1977 births
20th-century Australian people
21st-century Australian people